Orides de Lourdes Teixeira Fontela (April 24, 1940 — November 2, 1998) was a Brazilian poet.

Life 
Fontela was born in São João da Boa Vista, in 1940. She published poems in her hometown newspaper O Município, and in O Estado de S. Paulo's Suplemento Literário. She graduated in Philosophy at the University of São Paulo.

Fontela was awarded the Jabuti Prize for Poetry, in 1983, for her book Alba;  and the Associação Paulista de Críticos de Arte award, for the book Teia, in 1996. In 2007 the Brazilian Ministry of Culture honored her posthumously with the Order of Cultural Merit; her cousin Maria Helena Teixeira de Oliveira received the award.

Works 

 Transposição (1969)
 Helianto (1973)
 Alba (1983)
 Rosácea (1986)
 Trevo (1969-1988)
 Teia (1996)
 Poesia Reunida (2006)
 Poesia completa (2015)

References

External links
Howard, John. Orides Fontela: A Sketch. Brazzil Magazine Year 12, No. 172, April 2000

1940 births
1998 deaths
Recipients of the Order of Cultural Merit (Brazil)
Brazilian women writers
People from São João da Boa Vista